Rollin' wit Dana Dane is the third and final studio album by the American rapper Dana Dane, released in 1995.

Rollin' wit Dana Dane peaked at No. 42 on the Top R&B/Hip-Hop Albums. Two singles did fairly well: "Record Jock" made it to No. 61 on the Hot R&B/Hip-Hop Singles & Tracks and No. 11 on the Hot Rap Singles, while "Rollin' wit Dane" made it to No. 77 on the Hot R&B/Hip-Hop Single & Tracks and No. 25 on the Hot Rap Singles.

Production
The album was produced by DJ Battlecat, along with Smash Money and 3rd Rail. "Chester" is about child sexual abuse.

Critical reception

The Pittsburgh Post-Gazette wrote that Dane's "brand of softcore is imaginative at times, but suffers from fragile, home-grown synth beats that lack the verve of real instruments." The Charlotte Observer thought that "Dana's trippin' on wax now, searching for a beat, and even Battlecat (the dude that produced Domino and 2Pac) couldn't help him regain his seat."

Track listing
"Dedication" – 2:09 
"Once Again" – 3:55 
"In da Mix" – 4:17 featuring Don Perryon
"Rollin' wit Dane" – 4:21 
"Booty Call" – 1:33 
"Record Jock" – 4:06 
"Ain't No Love" – :44 
"Chester" – 3:51 
"Nina" – 4:27 
"Mama Told Me" – 4:52 featuring Don Perryon
"Show Me Love" – 4:00 featuring DJ Battlecat
"Fort Greene (S)Killz" – 5:07 featuring Lady Terra, Don Perryon, 3rd Rail, Gap Da Rippa, and Ike Capone
"Ain't No Love" – 4:30

References

1995 albums
Dana Dane albums
Albums produced by Battlecat (producer)
Maverick Records albums